Kulumur is a village in the Sendurai taluk of Ariyalur district, Tamil Nadu, India.

Demographics 

As per the 2001 census, Kulumur had a total population of 5028 with 2452 males and 2296 females.

References 

Villages in Ariyalur district